Anolis deltae, the delta anole, is a species of lizard in the family Dactyloidae. The species is found in Venezuela.

References

Anoles
Endemic fauna of Venezuela
Reptiles of Venezuela
Reptiles described in 1974
Taxa named by Ernest Edward Williams